Royal Air Force Holyhead or more simply RAF Holyhead is a former Royal Air Force station situated at Holyhead, Anglesey, Wales. It was the most westerly RAF base in Great Britain. The former headquarters building was Porth-y-felin House, a Grade II listed building that was sold by the Ministry of Defence in the 1990s.

Units

No. 52 Air/Sea Rescue Marine Craft Unit was formed at Holyhead on 28 March 1942 and was based until disbanded in May 1942.

No. 1113 Marine Craft Unit RAF which was formed at Holyhead on 1 July 1954 and was based until it was disbanded on 1 April 1986.

See also 
 Anglesey Airport
 RAF Valley
 RAF Mona

References

Sources

Buildings and structures in Anglesey
Royal Air Force stations in Wales
Holyhead